The 1989 Wisconsin Badgers football team represented the University of Wisconsin–Madison in the 1989 NCAA Division I-A football season.

Schedule

The Badgers allowed Indiana running back Anthony Thompson to rush for 377 yards in a game on November 11.  This broke the NCAA Division I-A record and stood as a Big Ten Conference single-game rushing record for 25 years until it was finally broken by Melvin Gordon (Wisconsin) in 2014.  However, the 377 yards still stands as an Indiana Hoosiers football school record.

Personnel

Season summary

Miami (FL)

Toledo

at California

Michigan

Iowa

Northwestern

at Illinois

at Minnesota

Indiana

at Ohio State

Michigan State

1990 NFL Draft

References

Wisconsin
Wisconsin Badgers football seasons
Wisconsin Badgers football